Turkey Run is a tributary of the West Branch Susquehanna River in Lycoming County, Pennsylvania, in the United States. The stream is not designated as an impaired waterbody. It is a relatively small stream and is located near State Correctional Institution – Muncy. The stream's watershed is designated as a Warmwater Fishery and a Migratory Fishery.

Course

Turkey Run begins at the base of a large mountain in Clinton Township. It flows east for a few tenths of a mile before turning south and passing through a small pond. After a few tenths of a mile, the stream turns southeast for several tenths of a mile, passing through another small pond, crossing Pennsylvania Route 405, and crossing railroad tracks. It then turns south-southwest for several tenths of a mile before reaching its confluence with the West Branch Susquehanna River.

Hydrology
Turkey Run is not designated as an impaired waterbody.

Geography and geology

Turkey Run was described as a "small stream" in an 1892 book of Lycoming County history. The stream is in a region known as the Black Hole Valley, along with Black Hole Creek.

Watershed
The stream is entirely within the United States Geological Survey quadrangle of Muncy. Its mouth is located within  of Seagers.

The designated use for Turkey Run is aquatic life. The stream is not far from Williamsport, but is on the opposite bank of the West Branch Susquehanna River. The State Correctional Institution Muncy is located near the headwaters of Turkey Run.

History
Turkey Run was entered into the Geographic Names Information System on August 2, 1979. Its identifier in the Geographic Names Information System is 1189947.

Peter Smith had a farm on Turkey Run by 1778. His wife and children were killed in July 1778. In August of that year, a group of soldiers and militia were sent to the farm to protect people helping Smith harvest his crop. Turkey Run provided power to gristmills and sawmills in the early days of settlement in the stream's vicinity.

A bridge carrying Pennsylvania Route 405 crosses Turkey Run. In 2013, an $85,000 bridge replacement was planned for 2014 to 2016. Turkey Run Partners once applied for and/or received a National Pollutant Discharge Elimination System permit to discharge stormwater into the stream during construction activities.

Biology
The drainage basin of Turkey Run is designated as a Warmwater Fishery and a Migratory Fishery. In the 1970s, the stream was described as being "moderately depressed" downstream of the State Correctional Institute Muncy.

See also
Black Hole Creek, next tributary of the West Branch Susquehanna River going downriver
Glade Run, next tributary of the West Branch Susquehanna River going upriver
List of rivers of Pennsylvania

References

Rivers of Lycoming County, Pennsylvania
Tributaries of the West Branch Susquehanna River
Rivers of Pennsylvania